Notozyga is a genus of brachiopods belonging to the family Chlidonophoridae.

The species of this genus are found in New Zealand and South African Republic.

Species:

Notozyga gracilis 
Notozyga lowenstami 
Notozyga maxwelli

References

Brachiopod genera